Dennis Gilligan is a male former wrestler who competed for England.

Wrestling career
He represented England in the -57 Kg division at the 1958 British Empire and Commonwealth Games in Cardiff, Wales.

He was a member of the Manchester YMCA Wrestling Club and the Barton Athletic Club and was three times British Bantamweight champion in 1965, 1967 and 1968.

See also 
 Stan Gilligan (brother) - England international wrestler.
 Joey Gilligan (nephew) - England international wrestler.

References

1931 births
English male wrestlers
Wrestlers at the 1958 British Empire and Commonwealth Games
Living people
Commonwealth Games competitors for England